Joanna  Nowicka (née Kwaśna born 25 July 1966 in Kołobrzeg) is a Polish archer, who competed in four consecutive Summer Olympics, starting in 1988. At the 1996 Olympic Games she won the bronze medal in the Women's Team Competition (together with Iwona Dzięcioł and Katarzyna Klata).

For her sport achievements, she received: 
 Silver Cross of Merit in 1996.

External links
Profile on Polish Olympic Committee

1966 births
Living people
Polish female archers
Archers at the 1988 Summer Olympics
Archers at the 1992 Summer Olympics
Archers at the 1996 Summer Olympics
Archers at the 2000 Summer Olympics
Olympic archers of Poland
People from Kołobrzeg
Olympic medalists in archery
Sportspeople from West Pomeranian Voivodeship
Medalists at the 1996 Summer Olympics
Olympic bronze medalists for Poland